Bertrand is a city in Mississippi County, Missouri, United States. The population was 718 at the 2020 census.

History
Bertrand was platted in 1859. The community has the name of one Mr. Bertrand, a railroad promoter. A post office called Bertrand has been in operation since 1874.

Geography
Bertrand is located at  (36.910323, -89.448213).

Demographics

2010 census
As of the census of 2010, there were 821 people, 341 households, and 232 families living in the city. The racial makeup of the city was 97.32% White, 1.83% Black or African American, 0.12% Native American, 0.12% Asian, 0.12% from other races, and 0.49% from two or more races. Hispanic or Latino of any race were 1.95% of the population.

There were 341 households, of which 33.4% had children under the age of 18 living with them, 45.2% were married couples living together, 18.8% had a female householder with no husband present, 4.1% had a male householder with no wife present, and 32.0% were non-families. 27.3% of all households were made up of individuals, and 12.6% had someone living alone who was 65 years of age or older. The average household size was 2.30 and the average family size was 2.74.

The median age in the city was 46.1 years. 23% of residents were under the age of 18; 5.9% were between the ages of 18 and 24; 19.8% were from 25 to 44; 28.4% were from 45 to 64; and 22.9% were 65 years of age or older. The gender makeup of the city was 45.2% male and 54.8% female.

2000 census
As of the census of 2000, there were 740 people, 316 households, and 207 families living in the city. The population density was 1,115.2 people per square mile (432.9/km2). There were 351 housing units at an average density of 528.9 per square mile (205.3/km2). The racial makeup of the city was 95.81% White, 2.84% African American, 0.41% Native American, and 0.95% from two or more races. Hispanic or Latino of any race were 0.41% of the population.

There were 316 households, out of which 21.5% had children under the age of 18 residing with them, 52.2% were married couples living together, 13.0% had a female householder with no husband present, and 34.2% were non-families. 29.7% of all households were made up of individuals, and 13.0% had someone living alone who was 65 years of age or older. The average household size was 2.17 and the average family size was 2.66.

In the city the population was spread out, with 17.0% under the age of 18, 7.6% from 18 to 24, 24.6% from 25 to 44, 27.6% from 45 to 64, and 23.2% who were 65 years of age or older. The median age was 46 years. For every 100 females there were 84.5 males. For every 100 females age 18 and over, there were 80.6 males.

The median income for a household in the city was $26,023, and the median income for a family was $32,833. Males had a median income of $24,643 versus $21,042 for females. The per capita income for the city was $15,346. About 14.6% of families and 15.4% of the population were below the poverty line, including 17.4% of those under age 18 and 11.7% of those age 65 or over.

References

External links
 Historic maps of Bertrand in the Sanborn Maps of Missouri Collection at the University of Missouri

Cities in Mississippi County, Missouri
Cities in Missouri